The Orde, later Campbell-Orde Baronetcy, of Morpeth in the County of Northumberland, is a title in the Baronetage of Great Britain. It was created on 9 August 1790 for the naval commander John Orde. He was the younger brother of Thomas Orde-Powlett, 1st Baron Bolton (see Baron Bolton for more information on this branch of the family). The third Baronet assumed in 1880 by Royal licence the additional surname of Campbell, which was that of his maternal grandfather Peter Campbell, of Kilmory.

Orde, later Campbell-Orde baronets, of Morpeth (1790)
Sir John Orde, 1st Baronet (1751–1824)
Sir John Powlett Orde, 2nd Baronet (9 June 1803 – 13 December 1878). Orde was born at Gloucester Place, St Marylebone, London, the son of Sir John Orde, 1st Baronet. He was educated at Christ Church, Oxford where he graduated with a BA. He married Eliza Campbell, eldest daughter and co-heir of Peter Campbell, of  Kilmory, Argyll, on 15 June 1826. They had one son and  three daughters. His father-in-law died in Jamaica in 1828 and upon the death of his wife in 1829 he inherited the estates in Jamaica and Scotland. He remarried in 1832 to Beatrice Edwards. Orde rebuilt Kilmory Castle in a Gothic style to a design by architect Joseph Gordon Davis, and remodelled the grounds with the aid of William Jackson Hooker. Kilmory is now the headquarters of Argyll and Bute Council. He was succeeded by his son Sir John William Powlett Orde who, in 1880, obtained Royal Licence to assume the surname of Campbell-Orde.
Sir John William Powlett Campbell-Orde, 3rd Baronet (1827–1897)
Sir Arthur John Campbell-Orde, 4th Baronet (1865–1933)
Sir Simon Arthur Campbell-Orde, 5th Baronet (1907–1969)
Sir John Alexander Campbell-Orde, 6th Baronet (1943–2016)
Sir John Simon Arthur Campbell-Orde, 7th Baronet (born 1981)

The heir presumptive is the present holder's uncle Peter Humphrey Campbell-Orde (born 1946)

See also
Baron Bolton

References

Kidd, Charles, Williamson, David (editors). Debrett's Peerage and Baronetage (1990 edition). New York: St Martin's Press, 1990.

Baronetcies in the Baronetage of Great Britain
1790 establishments in Great Britain